Love Ambition is the debut album by actor and singer by Jason Weaver. It was released on June 27, 1995 through the label Motown Records. The album contains the singles "Love Ambition (Call on Me)", and "I Can't Stand the Pain".

Track listing
Information is based on Liner Notes

 "I Can't Stand the Pain" (Keith Crouch)
 "Love Ambition (Call on Me)" (Keith Crouch)
 "On Top of the Hill" (Sean K. Hall, Christopher A. Stewart, Robin Thicke)
 "For the Love of You" (Chris Jasper, Ernie Isley, Marvin Isley, O'Kelly Isley, Ronald Isley, Rudolph Isley)
 "Pretty Brown" (J. R. Swinga)
 "So In Love" (Keith Crouch)
 "All Up Into You" (Sean K. Hall, Christopher A. Stewart, Robin Thicke)
 "Ordinary Guy" (Music & Lyrics by Hakim Abdulsamad)(Lyrics by Khiry Abdulsamad & Tajh Abdulsamad)
 "My Love" (Music & Lyrics by Hakim Abdulsamad)(Lyrics by Khiry Abdulsamad & Tajh Abdulsamad)

Personnel
Information is based on Liner Notes
Jason Weaver - Lead Vocals (All Tracks), Background Vocals (3-4, 7)
Hakim Abdulsamad - Boys Group Member (8-9), Keyboards, Drum Machine (8-9)
Khiry Abdulsamad - Boys Group Member (8-9)
Tajh Abdulsamad - Boys Group Member (8-9)
Bilal Abdulsamad - Boys Group Member (8-9)
The Boys - Producers (9, Music on 8), Background Vocals (8-9)
James “Chip” Bunton - Project Coordinator (3, 7)
Keith Crouch - Producer (1-2, 6, Music on 8), Instruments (6), Trumpet (2), Background Vocals (1-2)
Derrick Edmondson - Saxophone (2)
Sean “Sep” Hall - Producer, Rhythm Arranger, Vocal Arranger, Music Programming (3, 7)
Kitty Haywood - Lead Vocal Producer (8)
Rahsaan Patterson - Background Vocals (1-2)
Sherree Ford-Payne - Background Vocals (6)
Tricky Stewart - Producer, Rhythm Arranger, Vocal Arranger, Music Programming (3, 7)
J. R. Swinga - Producer, Instruments, Background Vocals (4-5), Music Programming (4)
Robin Thicke - Producer, Vocal Arranger (3, 7)

Singles

Love Ambition (Call on Me) (Released: May 22, 1995)
I Can't Stand the Pain (Released: August 29, 1995)

References

1995 albums